Grapevine is an unincorporated community located in Hopkins County, Kentucky, United States.

Raven Hill Cemetery

Local legend has it that the Raven Hill Cemetery within the Grapevine community is haunted. A blue orb supposedly appears there and follows people.

Grapevine Mine 

During the 1920s the community hosted a coal mine. The mine continued operation into the 1950s under management of the Black Star Coal Company, and later the Sheffield and Coy Coal Company. In May 1958 the mine was the site of a fire that began under fallen material in an abandoned section of the mine. The mine was closed but subsequently re-opened under management of the Five Star Coal Company in 1962.

References

Unincorporated communities in Hopkins County, Kentucky
Unincorporated communities in Kentucky